Paraporthesia is a monotypic moth genus in the subfamily Lymantriinae. Its only species, Paraporthesia indica, is found in India. Both the genus and the species were first described by S. L. Gupta, S. I. Farooqi and H. S. Chaudhary in 1986.

References

Lymantriinae
Monotypic moth genera